Michal Dragoun (born April 12, 1983) is a Czech professional ice hockey player currently playing for Mountfield HK of the Czech Extraliga.

Dragoun previously played with HC Sparta Praha, Motor České Budějovice, HC Litvínov and HC Kladno.

References

External links

1983 births
Living people
HC Berounští Medvědi players
Motor České Budějovice players
Czech ice hockey forwards
LHK Jestřábi Prostějov players
Rytíři Kladno players
HC Litvínov players
BK Mladá Boleslav players
IHC Písek players
HC Slavia Praha players
HC Slovan Ústečtí Lvi players
HC Sparta Praha players
Ice hockey people from Prague
Stadion Hradec Králové players